Dermot Joseph Kennedy (born 13 December 1991) is an Irish singer-songwriter. He is best known for his 2019 single "Outnumbered", his 2020 single "Giants" and his feature on the 2020 Meduza single "Paradise". He is signed to Interscope Records in the US, and Island Records for the rest of the world. His debut major-label studio album, Without Fear, was released on 4 October 2019.

Early life and family
Dermot Joseph Kennedy grew up in Rathcoole, County Dublin, Ireland. An avid football fan and player, Kennedy started playing guitar at age 10, and songwriting at age 14; however, he states that he did not begin to take music seriously until the age of 17. His parents were supportive of his musical study, and he credits his father for frequently driving him into Dublin to perform at open mic nights when he was underage. His mother submitted an application for him to study classical music at Maynooth University in County Kildare. He remained at university for three years. His paternal aunt is Irish TV personality and former newscaster Mary Kennedy.

Career
Dermot Kennedy officially began his career busking at 17 years old; however, his career did not become viable until his mid-twenties, having spent over a decade in the industry. Through busking, he was able to develop his sound, travelling to multiple major cities such as Dublin, in his home country Ireland, and Boston in the United States to perform. Kennedy was also invited to open for Glen Hansard, whom he had previously met while busking in Dublin and stayed in touch with via text message.

Outside of his solo career, Kennedy began a band named "Shadows and Dust" with three other members during his studies, including Micheál Quinn who is the current drummer for Dermot. Although he enjoyed the experience, the band later split up in 2015.

In 2018 and 2019, he toured the United States, Australia and Europe to sold-out audiences. His first festivals were Bonnaroo Music Festival in 2017; Lollapalooza, South by Southwest Festival and Austin City Limits Music Festival in 2018. He played Coachella Valley Music and Arts Festival both weekends in 2019.
In 2018, he was voted by listeners as NPR Slingshot's Best New Artist of The Year, appeared on NPR's Music Tiny Desk Concert in a 14-minute live acoustic session, on WGBH's Fraser performance studio in a 20-minute live session. He made the BBC's Sound of 2019 Longlist.

After releasing many singles and EPs, Kennedy released his first complete album in late 2019, titled Without Fear. The album consists of many of his past works, with some even dated eight years prior to the album's release.

In January 2020, Kennedy was nominated for international male solo artist of the year at the BRIT Awards. In 2021, Kennedy contributed a cover of the Metallica song "Nothing Else Matters" to the charity tribute album The Metallica Blacklist.

On 3 March 2022, Kennedy won the RTÉ Choice Music Prize Irish Song of the Year 2021 for his song "Better Days".

Philanthropy 
In early 2020, in collaboration with other artists, Kennedy contributed his vocals to Songs For Australia, covering Matt Corby's "Resolution". The album, organized by Julia Stone, was created to raise proceeds in aid of organizations helping Australia recover from their bushfire crisis.

Amidst the COVID-19 pandemic, Kennedy participated in Billboards Live At-Home concert. He helped them raise money for the non-profit Housing Works, by organizing a short virtual concert. Following that event, Kennedy organized his own virtual concert, Sound Waves, in May 2020 in support of WHO's Solidarity Response Fund.

On 6 September 2020, Kennedy played for the Soccer Aid charity match for the first time, joining other celebrities in raising money for UNICEF UK. Playing for the World XI team against England, he helped them win their second match in a row, scoring one of their three goals. The team ended up winning in a penalty shootout, turning their 3-3 score, to a 4-3 score victory. He was later named Man of the Match.

Style and influences
In his music, Kennedy has tried to bridge his two genres, folk and hip-hop, together. This is a change from his past works, which were more acoustic. Unlike some songwriters, he does not write with specific moments or events in mind. He writes them naturally when listening to the track, as specific memories and emotions are triggered through the music.

GQ magazine described Kennedy as a "singer with a rich, reverbant voice, [with] epically emotive songwriting skills (think Ed Sheeran, but darker, more melancholy)." The New York Times, of his 2018 South by Southwest Festival performance, said he has "a grainy, melancholy voice that can crest with a howling rasp..."

He cites Ray LaMontagne, David Gray, Damien Rice and Glen Hansard as inspirations for his folk style. His recent work has included hip-hop influences, reflected notably in his collaborative work with Mike Dean on the EP Mike Dean Presents: Dermot Kennedy, which Kennedy has also described as a "mix tape".

Discography

Studio albums
 Without Fear (2019)
 Sonder (2022)

References

External links

Irish male singers
Irish songwriters
1991 births
Living people
People from Rathcoole, County Dublin
Interscope Records artists
Island Records artists